Charlie George Bell (born 24 December 2002) is an English  footballer who plays for Moneyfields as  a centre midfielder.

Club career

Portsmouth
Bell progressed through Pompey's youth categories after joining the club at the age of 6.

Bell made his Portsmouth debut in a 1–0 defeat vs West Ham United U21s on 10 November 2020 in the EFL Trophy. Bell played the first 79 minutes of the game in the central midfield position. After impressing Jackett in the game against West Ham, Bell again started against Cheltenham Town, playing 62 minutes in a 3–0 win.

At the end of the 2020–21 season, Bell was released by the League One side.

Bognor Regis Town
In August 2021, Bell joined Isthmian League Premier Division side Bognor Regis Town following his release from Pompey.

Horsham
In September 2022, Bell signed for Horsham.

Moneyfields
After a short spell with Horsham, Bell put pen to paper and signed for Wessex Premier Division side Moneyfields on Thursday 6 October 2022 and made his debut two days later, coming on as a 60th minute substitute in a 3-0 away win against US Portsmouth.

Career statistics

References

External links
Portsmouth FC profile 

2002 births
Living people
Footballers from Portsmouth
English footballers
Portsmouth F.C. players
Bognor Regis Town F.C. players
Horsham F.C. players
Isthmian League players
Association football midfielders